The 1951 Copa del Generalísimo was the 49th staging of the Copa del Rey, the Spanish football cup competition.

The competition began on 29 April 1951 and concluded on 27 May 1951 with the final. FC Barcelona defeated Real Sociedad by 3–0 in the final.

First round 

|}
Bye: Sporting de Gijón and Atlético Tetuán.

First leg

Second leg

Quarter-finals 

|}

First leg

Second leg

Semi-finals 

|}

First leg

Second leg

Final 

|}

Top goalscorers 

Source

External links 
 rsssf.com 
 linguasport.com 

Copa del Rey seasons
1950–51 in Spanish football cups